Patriarch Torkom Koushagian (in Armenian Թորգոմ Գուշակեան) (27 December 1874 – 10 February 1939) was Armenian Patriarch of Jerusalem serving the Armenian Patriarchate of Jerusalem from 1931 to 1939.

He was born Mgrdich Koushagian in Bardizag, Ottoman Empire, in 1874. After studies at Armash seminary he was ordained priest on 25 September 1896. He was consecrated bishop on 19 September 1910. From 1914 he was the Armenian Archbishop of Egypt.

He took over the position in Jerusalem after Patriarch Yeghishe Tourian.

He was succeeded in 1939 by Patriarch Mesrob Nishanian.

References
Arshag Alboyadjian:։ Torkom Patriarch Koushagian։ Published by "Medavoragan Sbasarfutyants Kerasenyag, Cairo, Egypt, 1940.

External links
Torkom Koushagian's biography

Armenian Patriarchs of Jerusalem
Honorary Knights Commander of the Order of the British Empire
1874 births
1939 deaths
Armenians from the Ottoman Empire
20th-century Oriental Orthodox archbishops
19th-century Oriental Orthodox clergy